In enzymology, a 2,5-dihydroxypyridine 5,6-dioxygenase is an enzyme that catalyzes the chemical reaction

2,5-dihydroxypyridine + O2  N-formylmaleamic acid

The 2 substrates of this enzyme are 2,5-dihydroxypyridine and O2, whereas its product is N-formylmaleamic acid.

This enzyme belongs to the family of oxidoreductases, specifically those acting on single donors with O2 as oxidant and incorporation of two atoms of oxygen into the substrate (oxygenases). The oxygen incorporated need not be derived from O2.  It employs one cofactor, iron.

This enzyme participates in nicotinate and nicotinamide metabolism.

Nomenclature 

The systematic name of this enzyme class is 2,5-dihydroxypyridine:oxygen 5,6-oxidoreductase. Other names in common use include 2,5-dihydroxypyridine oxygenase, and pyridine-2,5-diol dioxygenase.

References

Further reading 

 
 
 
 

EC 1.13.11
Iron enzymes
Enzymes of unknown structure